The Canadian Transport Commission (CTC) was Canada's first fully converged, multi-modal regulator.

The body was created by Canada's Parliament on September 19, 1967, to assume the responsibilities of two bodies: the Board of Transport Commissioners (1938–1967), which oversaw air and railway regulation, and the Canadian Maritime Commission (1947–1967).  The Board of Transport Commissioners also bequeathed the CTC responsibility for telecommunications, which it regulated until ceding that jurisdiction to the Canadian Radio-Television Commission (CRTC) in 1976, leading the CRTC to change its name to the Canadian Radio-television and Telecommunications Commission. The CTC itself was renamed the National Transportation Agency (NTA) in 1988, then the Canadian Transportation Agency (CTA) in 1996.

In 1992 the NTA was given additional powers to make federally regulated transportation accessible for persons with disabilities, moving its scope beyond economic regulation and into consumer regulation for the first time in the modern era.

Federal departments and agencies of Canada
Canadian transport law
Mass media regulation in Canada
Telecommunications regulatory authorities
Government agencies established in 1938
Government agencies established in 1947
Government agencies established in 1967
Government agencies disestablished in 1967
Regulators of Canada